The grey pileated finch (Coryphospingus pileatus), also known as the pileated finch, is a species of bird in the family Thraupidae, where it has recently been moved to from the Emberizidae.  It is found in Brazil, Colombia, French Guiana, and Venezuela in subtropical or tropical dry forests, subtropical or tropical moist lowland forests, subtropical or tropical dry shrubland, and heavily degraded former forest.

Taxonomy
This species was first described by the German naturalist Prince Maximilian of Wied-Neuwied in 1821. Molecular analysis has shown that C.  pileatus and the red pileated finch (C. cucullatus) belong in the tanager family, Thraupidae, and form a sister group to a group containing the fulvous-crested tanager, the black-goggled tanager, the shrike tanagers and the grey-headed tanager. There are three recognised subspecies; C. p. brevicaudus from northern Colombia and northern Venezuela; C. p. rostratus from the upper Magdalena River Valley, Colombia; and C. p. pileatus from central and eastern Brazil.

Description
The male has a white eye ring and a small patch of scarlet on the top of the head which can be raised as a crest, and this is partially concealed by the black plumage on the rest of the crown. The upper parts of the body, wings and tail are grey while the underparts are whitish, grading to grey on the flanks and breast. The female has a similar colouring but lacks the red and black on the head.

Distribution and habitat
This species is native to South America, being found in northern Venezuela and northern and eastern Colombia, with a separate population in eastern Brazil extending from Fortaleza southward to Rio de Janeiro and as far west as the southern Mato Grosso.

Ecology
The grey pileated finch forages in small flocks, mostly on the ground but also in low undergrowth. Its diet is unknown. Breeding takes place in the wet season, this being some time between April and November in northern Venezuaella, and the exact timing depends on the onset of the rains.

Status
C. pileatus has a very wide range and is considered to be fairly common. Although the population size has not been estimated, it seems to be steady, and the International Union for Conservation of Nature has rated the bird's conservation status as being "least concern".

References

grey pileated finch
Birds of Colombia
Birds of Venezuela
Birds of the Caatinga
Birds of Brazil
grey pileated finch
Taxonomy articles created by Polbot